Sorakudy is a revenue village in the Thirunallar taluk of Karaikal District. It is situated to the south of  Nedungadu and north-west of Thirunallar.

References 

 

Villages in Karaikal district